is a railway station on the Ban'etsu West Line in the city of Aizuwakamatsu, Fukushima Prefecture,  Japan, operated by East Japan Railway Company (JR East).

Lines

Station layout
Hirota Station has a one side platform and one island platform connected to the station building by a level crossing. The station is unattended.

Platforms

History
Hirota Station opened on July 15, 1899. The station was absorbed into the JR East network upon the privatization of the Japanese National Railways (JNR) on April 1, 1987. The station building burned down o December 31, 2007 and was rebuilt in June 2008.

Surrounding area
former Kawahigashi Town Hall
Hirota Post Office

See also
 List of railway stations in Japan

External links

 JR East Station information 

Railway stations in Fukushima Prefecture
Ban'etsu West Line
Railway stations in Japan opened in 1899
Aizuwakamatsu